Cilicia Campaign of Kaykaus I (1216–1218) was a campaign that was part of the War of the Antiochene Succession and consisted of a series of battles and sieges.

Background

Sultan Kaykaus was besieged in Kayseri by his brother Kayqubad. The Armenian king Leo I was also present in this siege. Sultan Kaykaus decided to separate Kayqubad's allies in order to escape the siege, and gave Leo I, Ulukışla and Ereğli and brought him out of the siege.

While the Sultan was dealing with the rebellion in Antalya, King Leo had also occupied Larende. After suppressing the rebellion, the Sultan decided to go on a campaign both to save the lost Larende, Ereğli and Ulukışla and to bring the Armenians back under obedience.

Expedition
The Sultan completed the preparations for the expedition and gathered his army in Konya in 1216. Moving from Konya to Larende, the Sultan besieged and captured Larende. After that, the Sultan, walking towards Kayseri, captured the Ereğli and Ulukışla Castles one by one on the road. He re-appointed the old lords of these places to the castles.

After liberating Larende, Ereğli and Ulukışla, Sultan gathered his army in Kayseri. He also invited one of the Ayyubids, Malik Zahir Ghazi, to the expedition. However, Zahir Gazi did not give any answer and died in October 1216. After this incident, the Sultan entered the Armenian lands from the Kösidere region with the Emir of Marash, Nusreteddin Hasan. The Sultan first besieged Çinçin Castle. The people desperately wished for forgiveness and surrendered the castle. Warehouses and supply depots were confiscated and commanders were assigned to the castle. After that, the Sultan besieged the Hançin Castle. The people again surrendered, but those who insisted on resisting were put to the sword. Again, the warehouses and supply depots were confiscated and commanders were assigned to the castle.

Then the Sultan marched on King Leo himself. Old and paralyzed, the king appointed the senior Constantine to head the army. Constantine and his army set up a karahgah at the Shoghagan Monastery near Marash and waited for the Seljuk army. Sultan Izz-ad-din sent Mubariz-ad-din Bahramshah with his 3,000-strong vanguard force to identify the Armenian army. Mubariz-ad-din Bahramshah engaged in battle on the Melhama Plain after locating the Armenian army.

The Sultan also besieged the Keban Fortress near Marash. The siege lasted more fiercely than expected. Baron Leon and some castle chiefs made a sudden attack, burning the Seljuk catapults and managed to get out of the castle. The Sultan also gave up on besieging the castle and landed on the Keban Plain and engaged in a pitched battle with Constantine and Baron Leon. The battle lasted until the evening, and the Armenian army was dissolved when the Seljuk army engulfed the Armenian army.

References

Military history of Turkey